Hiroshi Takamura (髙村 祐, born September 2, 1969) is a former Nippon Professional Baseball pitcher, and current the second squad pitching corch for the Fukuoka SoftBank Hawks of Nippon Professional Baseball (NPB).

He previously played for the Kintetsu Buffaloes, the Tohoku Rakuten Golden Eagles.

Professional career

Active player era
On November 22, 1991, Takamura was drafted  first round pick by the Kintetsu Buffaloes in the  1991 Nippon Professional Baseball draft.

He debuted in the Pacific League in his rookie year, the 1992 season, and won the 1992 Pacific League Rookie of the Year Award with 13 wins, beating out Kenichi Wakatabe.

After his 13th season with the Buffaloes in 2004, the Osaka Kintetsu Buffaloes ceased to exist due to the 2004 Nippon Professional Baseball realignment, and he was transferred to the Tohoku Rakuten Golden Eagles in the distribution draft.

He only pitched in one game during the 2005 season before retiring at the end of the season.

In his 14-season career, Takamura pitched in 287 games, posting a 83-102 win–loss record, 9 saves, and a 4.31 ERA.

After retirement
After his retirement, Takamura became the second squad pitching development coach for the Tohoku Rakuten Golden Eagles in the 2007 season, and was named second squad pitching coach in the 2009 season.

He also served as the second squad pitching development coach again beginning with the 2012 season and as the first squad pitching coach for the 2015 season.

He was named second squad  pitching coach for the Fukuoka Softbank Hawks for the 2016 season.

He is also the first squad pitching coach from the 2017 season through the 2021 season and second squad pitching coach beginning in the 2022 season.

References

External links

 Career statistics - NPB.jp 
 98 Hiroshi Takamura PLAYERS2022 - Fukuoka SoftBank Hawks Official site

1969 births
Living people
Baseball people from Tochigi Prefecture
Hosei University alumni
Japanese baseball players
Nippon Professional Baseball pitchers
Kintetsu Buffaloes players
Osaka Kintetsu Buffaloes players
Tohoku Rakuten Golden Eagles players
Nippon Professional Baseball Rookie of the Year Award winners
Japanese baseball coaches
Nippon Professional Baseball coaches